Face the Truth is an American syndicated panel talk show hosted by Vivica A. Fox, which ran from September 2018 to May 2019. It was distributed by CBS Television Distribution (now known as CBS Media Ventures).

Series background 
In March 2018, CBS announced that Face the Truth would be coming to its daytime television lineup. The series was produced by Jay McGraw and Stage 29 Productions and had recruited panelists such as Jon Taffer, Judy Ho, and Rosie Mercado. Phil McGraw also served as an executive producer on the series. The show was filmed at Paramount Studios’ Stage 30 and used the same set as fellow CBS talk show The Doctors.

It was described as a series focused on conflict resolution, with guests presenting problems and receiving advice from the panel of experts. The program also featured participation from a live studio audience that offered opinions on the problems presented in each episode.

The show premiered on September 10, 2018. After one season, CBS announced the program’s cancellation in April 2019.

Cast

Main 

 Vivica A. Fox as Herself (Host)
 Judy Ho as Herself (Host)
 Rosie Mercado as Herself (Host)
 Mary Chrzanowski as Herself (Host)
 Areva Martin as Herself (Host)

Guest Stars 

 Farrah Laurel Abraham as (Herself)
 Slade Smiley as (Himself)
 Gretchen Rossi as (Herself)
 Tyrone Evans Clark as Himself (Ty)
 Kim DePaola as (Herself)
 Keyaira Hamilton as (Herself)
 Heavenly Kimes as (Herself)
 Robert L. Wilson as (Himself)
 Kelsey Cook as (Herself)
 Tarek El Moussa as Himself (Panelist)
 Alex Thomas as Himself (Panelist)

References

External links 

 
 Face the Truth at TV Guide

English-language television shows
2020s American television talk shows
Television series by CBS Studios
2018 American television series debuts